Petaurista is a genus of rodent in the family Sciuridae. They are large to very large flying squirrels found in forests and other wooded habitats in southern and eastern Asia.

Like other flying squirrels, they are mostly nocturnal and able to glide (not actually fly like a bat) long distances between trees by spreading out their patagium, skin between their limbs. They feed primarily on plant material, but will also take small animals such as insects.

Taxonomy

The species level taxonomy is very complex and not fully resolved. In 2005, Mammal Species of the World recognised eight species, but later studies have found that some of these were highly polyphyletic,  and recent authorities have often recognised some of the most divergent "subspecies" as valid species. Additionally, three new species were described from northeastern India in 2007–2013, although their validity needs to be confirmed.

Living species
Eight species were recognised in Mammal Species of the World in 2005:

 Red and white giant flying squirrel, Petaurista alborufus Milne-Edwards, 1870
 Spotted giant flying squirrel, Petaurista elegans Müller, 1840
 Japanese giant flying squirrel, Petaurista leucogenys Temminck, 1827
 Hodgson's giant flying squirrel, Petaurista magnificus Hodgson, 1836
 Bhutan giant flying squirrel, Petaurista nobilis Gray, 1842
 Red giant flying squirrel, Petaurista petaurista Pallas, 1766
 Indian giant flying squirrel, Petaurista philippensis Elliot, 1839
 Chinese giant flying squirrel, Petaurista xanthotis Milne-Edwards, 1872

Seven additional species now often recognised, but traditionally considered subspecies:

 White-bellied giant flying squirrel, Petaurista albiventer Gray, 1834
 Grey-headed giant flying squirrel, Petaurista caniceps Gray, 1842
 Formosan giant flying squirrel, Petaurista grandis Swinhoe, 1863
 Hainan giant flying squirrel, Petaurista hainana G. Allen, 1925
 Taiwan giant flying squirrel, Petaurista lena Thomas, 1907
 Petaurista marica Thomas, 1912
 Chindwin giant flying squirrel, Petaurista sybilla Thomas and Wroughton, 1916

Three new species that were described by Anwaruddin Choudhury from Arunachal Pradesh in 2007–2013:

 Mechuka giant flying squirrel, Petaurista mechukaensis Choudhury, 2007
 Mishmi giant flying squirrel, Petaurista mishmiensis Choudhury, 2009
 Mebo giant flying squirrel, Petaurista siangensis Choudhury, 2013

Extinct species
In addition to the living species, there are a few extinct species that only are known from fossil remains from the Mid and Late Pleistocene in China, the Russian Far East and Germany:

 †Petaurista brachyodus Young, 1934
 †Petaurista helleri Dehm, 1962
 †Petaurista tetyukhensis Tiunov & Gimranov, 2019

References 

 
Rodent genera
Taxa named by Johann Heinrich Friedrich Link
Taxonomy articles created by Polbot